Ovid Township is a civil township of Branch County in the U.S. state of Michigan. The population was 2,326 at the 2010 census.

Communities 
The township, which is primarily agricultural, does not have any incorporated municipalities. Five settlements exist in several unincorporated communities:

Geography
The township is dominated geographically by lakes, primarily Coldwater Lake, as well as the smaller Lake of the Woods and several others. All drain into the Coldwater River, a tributary of the St. Joseph River flowing to Lake Michigan.

Demographics
As of the census of 2000, there were 2,432 people, 1,026 households, and 738 families residing in the township. The racial makeup of the township was 98.11% White, 0.21% Native American, 0.33% Asian, 0.53% from other races, and 0.82% from two or more races. Hispanic or Latino of any race were 1.07% of the population.

There were 1,026 households, out of which 25.1% had children under the age of 18 living with them, 62.9% were married couples living together, 5.2% had a female householder with no husband present, and 28.0% were non-families. 23.5% of all households were made up of individuals, and 10.0% had someone living alone who was 65 years of age or older. The average household size was 2.37 and the average family size was 2.77.

In the township the population was spread out, with 20.9% under the age of 18, 6.6% from 18 to 24, 24.5% from 25 to 44, 30.6% from 45 to 64, and 17.4% who were 65 years of age or older. The median age was 44 years. For every 100 females, there were 105.8 males. For every 100 females age 18 and over, there were 101.6 males.

The median income for a household in the township was $44,593, and the median income for a family was $49,712. Males had a median income of $36,410 versus $23,382 for females. The per capita income for the township was $21,942. About 3.0% of families and 3.1% of the population were below the poverty line, including 3.3% of those under age 18 and 5.0% of those age 65 or over.

References

External links
Ovid Township official website

Townships in Branch County, Michigan
Townships in Michigan